Gura Ocniței is a commune in Dâmbovița County, Muntenia, Romania. It is composed of four villages: Adânca, Gura Ocniței, Ochiuri and Săcueni.

Natives
 Mircea Drăgan

References

Communes in Dâmbovița County
Localities in Muntenia